The ceremonial county of East Sussex,
(which includes the unitary authority of
Brighton & Hove)
is divided into 8 parliamentary constituencies
- 4 borough constituencies
and 4 county constituencies.

Constituencies

2010 boundary changes
Under the Fifth Periodic Review of Westminster constituencies, the Boundary Commission for England decided to retain the existing 8 constituencies in East Sussex, with minor changes to realign constituency boundaries with those of current local government wards, and to reduce the electoral disparity between constituencies.

Proposed boundary changes 
See 2023 Periodic Review of Westminster constituencies for further details.

Following the abandonment of the Sixth Periodic Review (the 2018 review), the Boundary Commission for England formally launched the 2023 Review on 5 January 2021. Initial proposals were published on 8 June 2021 and, following two periods of public consultation, revised proposals were published on 8 November 2022. Final proposals will be published by 1 July 2023.

The commission has proposed that East Sussex be combined with West Sussex as a sub-region of the South East Region, resulting in the creation of a new cross-county boundary constituency named East Grinstead and Uckfield. The resultant changes to existing constituencies would entail the abolition of Wealden and the creation of the new constituency of Sussex Weald. Although its boundaries are unchanged, it is proposed that Hove is renamed Hove and Portslade.

The following constituencies are proposed:

Containing electoral wards from Brighton and Hove

 Brighton Kemptown (part)
 Brighton Pavilion
 Hove and Portslade

Containing electoral wards from Eastbourne

 Eastbourne

Containing electoral wards from Hastings

 Hastings and Rye (part)

Containing electoral wards from Lewes

 Brighton Kemptown (part)
 East Grinstead and Uckfield (part)1
 Lewes (part)

Containing electoral wards from Rother

 Bexhill and Battle (part)
 Hastings and Rye (part)

Containing electoral wards from Wealden

 Bexhill and Battle (part)
 East Grinstead and Uckfield (part)1
 Lewes (part)
 Sussex Weald

1 Also contains part of Mid Sussex District in West Sussex

Results history
Primary data source: House of Commons research briefing - General election results from 1918 to 2019

2019 
The number of votes cast for each political party who fielded candidates in constituencies comprising East Sussex in the 2019 general election were as follows:

Percentage votes 

11983 & 1987 - SDP-Liberal Alliance

* Included in Other

Seats 

11983 & 1987 - SDP-Liberal Alliance

Maps

Historic representation by party
A cell marked → (with a different colour background to the preceding cell) indicates that the previous MP continued to sit under a new party name.

The Local Government Act 1972 moved the District of Mid Sussex into West Sussex from East Sussex. This change was put into effect in the Parliamentary constituency boundaries for the 1983 boundary changes.

1885 to 1918

1918 to 1950

1950 to 1983

1983 to present

See also

 List of parliamentary constituencies in the South East (region)

Notes

References

 
Sussex, East
Parliamentary
Parliamentary constituencies